Mariano Riccio (born 1510) was an Italian painter of the Renaissance period.

He was born at Messina, and painted altarpieces. He was a pupil of Franco, and afterwards of Polidoro da Caravaggio, whose style he successfully imitated. His son, Antonello Riccio, was also a painter.

References
    

1510 births
16th-century Italian painters
Italian male painters
Italian Renaissance painters
Painters from Messina
Year of death unknown